Sunji could refer to:

Šunji, village in Konjic Municipality, Bosnia and Herzegovina
Sunji, Lixin County (孙集镇), town in Lixin County, Anhui, China
Sunji Township (孙集乡), in Shanghe County, Shandong, China
Sunji, Linyi County, Shanxi (孙吉镇), town in Linyi County, Shanxi, China